Carlos Carbonell Gil (born 12 May 1995), commonly known as Tropi, is a Spanish professional footballer who plays for Primera División RFEF club CD Atlético Baleares.

Club career
Born in Valencia, Valencian Community, Tropi joined Valencia CF's youth setup in 2002, aged seven. He was promoted to the reserves in July 2014, and made his senior debut on 24 August, starting in a 1–2 away loss against RCD Mallorca B in the Segunda División B.

On 25 January 2015 Tropi scored his first senior goal in a 1–1 home draw against Huracán Valencia CF. A day later, he was called up to the main squad by manager Nuno Espírito Santo.

After being an unused substitute in a 1–0 home win against Getafe CF on 15 February 2015, Tropi made his first team – and La Liga – debut on 20 March 2015, coming on as a late substitute for Dani Parejo in a 4–0 away routing over Elche CF. On 25 July 2016, he was loaned to Segunda División side AD Alcorcón for two years.

On 11 July 2017, Tropi joined fellow second-tier club Lorca FC. He left Valencia on 30 June of the following year as his contract was not renewed, and signed a one-year deal with Recreativo de Huelva on 15 August. On 19 July 2019, Tropi signed a two-year contract with another reserve team, Atlético Madrid B also in division three. The following year, in September 2020, he signed with UCAM Murcia.

On 27 January 2022, Tropi moved to Primera División RFEF club Rayo Majadahonda.

In January 2023, Tropi joined CD Atlético Baleares on a deal until the end of the season.

Club statistics

References

External links
Valencia official profile

Official web: http://www.tropi.es

1995 births
Living people
Footballers from Valencia (city)
Spanish footballers
Association football midfielders
La Liga players
Segunda División players
Segunda División B players
Valencia CF Mestalla footballers
Valencia CF players
AD Alcorcón footballers
Lorca FC players
Recreativo de Huelva players
Atlético Madrid B players
UCAM Murcia CF players
CF Rayo Majadahonda players
CD Atlético Baleares footballers